The Manning Clark House, designed by Australian architect, Robin Boyd in 1952, is a house located at 11 Tasmania Circle, a suburb of Canberra in the Australian Capital Territory. The house was built for Professor Manning Clark (1915 – 1991), described as "Australia's most famous historian", and his wife, Dymphna Clark, (1916 – 2000), a linguist and educator. 

The house in now home to Manning Clark House Inc. (MCH), a community based institution that nurtures creative practice and research in Australian history, human rights, literature, music, visual art, and indigenous culture, as well as discussion and debate on issues of public importance and all areas of scholarly interest. The organisation supports the intellectual and creative community through a network of scholars and community garden. The program includes public lectures, open forums, seminars, conferences, art exhibitions, poetry readings, concerts, book launches, human rights education, and social gatherings in the former home of Manning and Dymphna Clark.

Following the 2000 death of Dymphna Clark, the house was transferred to community use.

A full calendar of events is available on the webpage.

References

External links
 http://www.manningclark.org.au

Heritage organizations
History organisations based in Australia
Houses in Canberra
Houses completed in 1952
1952 establishments in Australia